Josephine St. Pierre Ruffin (August 31, 1842 – March 13, 1924) was an African-American publisher, journalist, civil rights leader, suffragist, and editor of the Woman's Era, the first national newspaper published by and for African-American women.

Early years and education
Ruffin was born in Boston, Massachusetts, to John St. Pierre, of French and African descent from Martinique, and Elizabeth Matilda Menhenick from Cornwall, England. Her father was a successful clothier and founder of a Boston Zion Church. She attended public schools in Charlestown and Salem, and a private school in New York City because of her parents' objections to the segregated schools in Boston. She completed her studies at the Bowdoin School (not to be confused with Bowdoin College), after segregation in Boston schools ended.

At 16 years old, she married George Lewis Ruffin (1834–1886), who went on to become the first African-American graduate from Harvard Law School, the first African American elected to the Boston City Council, and the first African-American municipal judge. The couple moved to Liverpool but returned to Boston soon afterwards and bought a house in the West End.

Activism 

Working with her husband, Ruffin became active in the struggle against slavery. During the Civil War, they helped recruit black soldiers for the Union Army, the 54th and 55th Massachusetts regiments. They also worked for the Sanitation Commission, which provided aid for the care of soldiers in the field. After the war ended, Ruffin turned her attention to organizing for the Kansas Freedmen's Relief Association, collecting money and clothes to send to aid southern blacks resettling in Kansas, known as Exodusters.

Ruffin supported women's suffrage and, in 1869, joined with Julia Ward Howe and Lucy Stone to form the American Woman Suffrage Association (AWSA) in Boston. A group of these women, Howe and Stone also founded the New England Women's Club in 1868. Josephine Ruffin was its first black member when she joined in the mid-1890s.

Ruffin founded the first black woman's newspaper, The Woman's Era. She also wrote for the black weekly paper, The Courant, and became a member of the New England Woman's Press Association.

In 1910, Ruffin helped form the National Association for the Advancement of Colored People (NAACP). She was one of the charter members of the NAACP.

The Woman's Era 
 When her husband George died at the age of 52 in 1886, Ruffin used her financial security and organizational abilities to start the Woman's Era, the country's first newspaper published by and for African-American women. She served as the editor and publisher from 1890 to 1897. While promoting interracial activities, the Woman's Era called on black women to demand increased rights for their race.

Club work 
In 1891, she served as the first president of Boston's Co-Worker's Club, a reputable charitable organization.

In 1894, Ruffin organized the Woman's Era Club, an advocacy group for black women, with the help of her daughter Florida Ridley and Maria Baldwin, a Boston school principal.

In 1895, Ruffin organized the National Federation of Afro-American Women. She convened the First National Conference of the Colored Women of America in Boston, which was attended by women from 42 black women's clubs from 14 states. The following year, the organization merged with the Colored Women's League to form the National Association of Colored Women's Clubs (NACWC). Mary Church Terrell was elected president and Ruffin served as one of the organization's vice-presidents.

Just as the NACWC was forming, Ruffin was integrating the New England Woman's Club.  When the General Federation of Women's Clubs met in Milwaukee in 1900, she planned to attend as a representative of three organizations – the Woman's Era Club, the New England Woman's Club and the New England Woman's Press Club. Southern women were in positions of power in the General Federation and, when the Executive Committee discovered that all of the New Era's club members were black, they would not accept Ruffin's credentials. Ruffin was told that she could be seated as a representative of the two white clubs but not the black one. She refused on principle and was excluded from the proceedings. These events became known as "The Ruffin Incident" and were widely covered in newspapers around the country, most of whom supported Ruffin. Afterwards, the Woman's Era Club made an official statement "that colored women should confine themselves to their clubs and the large field of work open to them there."

The New Era Club was disbanded in 1903, but Ruffin remained active in the struggle for equal rights. Along with other women who had belonged to the New Era Club, she co-founded the League of Women for Community Service, which still exists today.

Personal life

Ruffin and her husband had five children: Hubert, an attorney; Florida Ridley, a school principal and co-founder of Woman's Era; Stanley, an inventor; George, a musician; and Robert, who died before his first birthday.

She died of nephritis at her home on St. Botolph Street, Boston, in 1924, and was buried in Mount Auburn Cemetery, Cambridge.

Legacy

In 1995, Ruffin was inducted into the National Women's Hall of Fame.

In 1999 a series of six tall marble panels with a bronze bust in each was added to the Massachusetts State House; the busts are of Ruffin, Florence Luscomb, Mary Kenney O'Sullivan, Dorothea Dix, Sarah Parker Remond, and Lucy Stone. Two quotations from each of those women (including Ruffin) are etched on their own marble panel, and the wall behind all the panels has wallpaper made of six government documents repeated over and over, with each document being related to a cause of one or more of the women.

Her home on Charles Street is a site on the Boston Women's Heritage Trail.

References

Further reading

External links
 Josephine Ruffin, activist, philanthropist and newspaper publisher at the African American Registry
 African American Women in History
 Josephine St. Pierre Ruffin: A pioneer in the black women's club movement - Part 1
 Josephine St. Pierre Ruffin: A pioneer in the black women's club movement - Part 2

1842 births
1924 deaths
African-American abolitionists
African-American journalists
American women journalists
African-American publishers (people)
American publishers (people)
Activists for African-American civil rights
African Americans in the American Civil War
American people of Cornish descent
American women's rights activists
Writers from Boston
Women in the American Civil War
19th century in Boston
Burials at Mount Auburn Cemetery
American suffragists
African-American women journalists
African-American history in Boston
American people of Martiniquais descent
African-American suffragists
People from the West End, Boston
Women civil rights activists
20th-century African-American people
20th-century African-American women
19th-century African-American writers
19th-century African-American women writers
19th-century American women writers
19th-century American journalists